The 1989–90 season was Arsenal's 71st consecutive season in the top division of English football. After winning the title the previous season, Arsenal finished fourth in 1989–90, behind champions Liverpool, runners-up Aston Villa and third-placed Tottenham Hotspur in the title challenge.

Season summary

Arsenal's campaign to retain the Championship in 1989-90 began well once they recovered from a 4-1 drubbing by Manchester United on the opening day, and in November they were on top. But the signs were not good; few of their victories were comfortable. The 4–3 home victory over Norwich on the first Saturday of November was particularly uncomfortable. The game marked David O'Learys 622nd major match for Arsenal, a club record, and it was an eventful occasion. O'Leary scored an equaliser as Arsenal recovered from 3-1 down and was also shown the yellow card. Then a last-minute penalty which gave Arsenal victory sparked a fracas involving 19 players. Three weeks later the FA Disciplinary Committee fined Norwich £50.000 and Arsenal £20.000. It was the first time clubs had been responsible for their players in such an incident. Arsenal's wheels wobbled in the fourth round of the Littlewoods Cup in November. After a two-leg, 8–1 victory over Plymouth and a 1–0 victory over Liverpool at Highbury, a visit to Second Division Oldham did not seem so awesome. Yet they were beaten 3-1 and, from Christmas onwards, their season fell apart. Five out of six successive away games were lost, with only one goal scored. FA-cup defeat at Queens Park Rangers followed, David Rocastle and Michael Thomas suffered dramatic losses in form and the goals dried up for Alan Smith, only 10 compared to 23 the previous season. On the other hand, the introduction of Kevin Campbell was an exiting indication of the future.

As Arsenal had seen before, winning the championship and retaining it were different propositions. A final position of fourth was no disgrace, but it was 17 points behind Liverpool F.C.

Adams, Rocastle and Smith were all in Bobby Robsons preliminary squad to World Cup 1990. Adams was axed in preference to Mark Wright, Rocastle was excluded although he had played in five of England's six World Cup qualifying matches. Smith was omitted in favour of Steve Bull.

Results

FA Charity Shield

As league champions, Arsenal contested the 1989 FA Charity Shield against Liverpool, who beat their local rivals Everton to win the 1989 FA Cup Final.  Liverpool won the match on 12 August 1989 by 1–0 with a goal from Peter Beardsley.

First Division

Football League Cup

FA Cup

Arsenal entered the FA Cup in the third round proper, in which they were drawn to face Stoke City.

Squad

Top scorers

First Division
  Alan Smith 10
  Paul Merson 7
  Brian Marwood 6
  Michael Thomas 5
  Tony Adams 5
  Lee Dixon 5

See also

 1989–90 in English football
 List of Arsenal F.C. seasons

References

Arsenal
Arsenal F.C. seasons